"Leja Leja Re" is a Hindi song by Shreya Ghoshal and Ustad Sultan Khan from the album Ustad & the Divas.

It was rerecorded by Tanishk Bagchi and renamed Leja Re, and the new version was sung by Dhvani Bhanushali.

Shreya Ghoshal version
Shreya Ghoshal initially was to sing two songs for Ustad Sultan Khan's album. However, due to time constraints, she had to let go of one and only recorded "Leja Leja Re". The video features models Nina Sarkar and Varun Toorkey

The song was featured on MTV Unplugged. It has been viewed more than 90 million times on YouTube as of 1 July 2020.

Dhvani Bhanushali version

The song was rerecorded in 2018 by Tanishk Bagchi and sung by Dhvani Bhanushali.

Music video
The music video was released on YouTube by T-Series and went viral, making Dhvani an established young singer in the music industry. As of May 2021, it has 793 million views.

Reception
"Leja Re" has become widely popular in India with its presence in North Indian marriages.

References

Shreya Ghoshal songs
Hindi songs
Indian songs
Rahat Fateh Ali Khan songs
Dhvani Bhanushali songs